The coefficient of inbreeding of an individual is the probability that two alleles at any locus in an individual are identical by descent from the common ancestor(s) of the two parents.

This should not be confused with the coefficient of relationship.

References

Population genetics